The 1994 Florida Attorney General election was held on November 8, 1994. Democratic incumbent Bob Butterworth defeated Republican nominee Henry Ferro with 57.50% of the vote.

Candidates

Democratic 

 Bob Butterworth

Republican 

 Henry Ferro

General Election

Results

References 

Florida Attorney General elections
1994 Florida elections
Florida